Lazaros Sochos (1862–1911) was a Greek sculptor. He was born in Tinos and educated in Athens under Leonidas Drosis. He later studied also in Paris.

He is best known for the statue of Theodoros Kolokotronis in front of the Old Parliament House, Athens.

Gallery

References

1862 births
1911 deaths
Greek sculptors
People from Tinos
20th-century sculptors
19th-century sculptors
19th-century Greek sculptors
20th-century Greek sculptors